Nematalosa flyensis, the Fly River gizzard shad, is a species of freshwater ray-finned fish within the family Clupeidae. The species is endemic to Papua New Guinea, and is only known to inhabit the Fly and Strickland Rivers.

Biology 
Nematalosa flyensis inhabits rivers at depths up to 50 meters, but isn't known if it also inhabits estuaries. It is also known to enter floodplain areas. Individuals are known to grow as big as 22.2 centimeters in length.

Conservation 
Nematalosa flyensis has been classified as 'Data deficient' by the IUCN Red List. Little is known about the population and threats of the species, and since its endemic to a single river system it could be susceptible to degradation, droughts, algal blooms and fishing, although whether these greatly impact the species is unknown. No conservation efforts have been made so far.

References 

Fish described in 1983
Freshwater fish of New Guinea
Fish of New Guinea
Clupeidae